Barb Broen-Ouelette (born 25 October 1964) is a Canadian volleyball player. She competed in the women's tournament at the 1984 Summer Olympics. She also competed in the beach volleyball tournament at the 1996 Summer Olympics.

References

External links
 

1964 births
Living people
Canadian women's volleyball players
Canadian women's beach volleyball players
Olympic volleyball players of Canada
Olympic beach volleyball players of Canada
Volleyball players at the 1984 Summer Olympics
Beach volleyball players at the 1996 Summer Olympics
Sportspeople from Edmonton